Michaël R. Roskam (born 1972, in Sint-Truiden) is a Belgian film director.

Career
Roskam attended St. Lucas Academy of Fine Arts in Brussels, where he studied painting and contemporary art, and the Binger Film Institute in Amsterdam where he graduated in 2005 with a master's degree in script writing and development.

After several jobs as a journalist for Flemish newspaper De Morgen and a copywriter, he wrote a script for a short film titled Haun in 2002. This was followed by Carlo (2004), another short film which won the Audience Award at Leuven International Short Film Festival. In 2005, he made The One Thing To Do and in 2007 Today is Friday, based on an Ernest Hemingway book, that was filmed in Los Angeles.

Roskam made his feature film debut with Bullhead which was released in 2011. On 24 January 2012, the film was nominated for the Academy Award for Best Foreign Language Film. He was named by Variety as one of the "10 directors to watch". He received the Magritte Award for Best Screenplay and the André Cavens Award for Best Film by the Belgian Film Critics Association (UCC). In June 2012, Roskam was invited to join the Academy of Motion Picture Arts and Sciences along with 175 other individuals.

His film The Drop, starring Tom Hardy, Noomi Rapace, Matthias Schoenaerts and James Gandolfini premiered at the Toronto International Film Festival on 5 September 2014. The Drop was Gandolfini's last on-screen performance before his death in June 2013 and received positive reviews from critics.

Roskam returned to Belgian cinema six years after Bullhead with The Racer and the Jailbird, starring Matthias Schoenaerts which was released in 2017.

Filmography

Short films
 Haun (2002)
 Carlo (2004)
 The One Thing to Do (2005)
 Today is Friday (2007)

Feature films
 Bullhead (2011)
 The Drop (2014)
 Racer and the Jailbird (2017)
 The Tiger (upcoming)

Television
 Berlin Station (2016) (Episodes 1, 2)
 Black Bird (2022) (Episodes 1, 2, 3)

References

External links
 

1972 births
Living people
Belgian film directors
Place of birth missing (living people)
Magritte Award winners